Krzesławice may refer to the following places in Poland:
Krzesławice, Lesser Poland Voivodeship
Krzesławice, Masovian Voivodeship
Krzesławice, part of the Wzgórza Krzesławickie district of Kraków